"Screw" (stylized as SCREW) was 14th single by the J-pop singer, Kotoko, was released on December 16, 2009. The title track was used as the theme song for Mamoru Oshii's film Assault Girls.

The single comes in a limited CD+DVD edition (GNCV-0022) and a regular CD-only edition (GNCV-0023). The DVD contains the promotional video for "SCREW".

Track listing 
Screw—5:25
Lyrics: Kotoko
Composition/arrangement: Kazuya Takase
Buccaneer—5:06
Lyrics: Kotoko
Composition/arrangement: Maiko Iuchi
Screw (instrumental) -- 5:25
Buccaneer (instrumental) -- 5:02

Charts and sales
Daily chart peak - #11
Weekly chart peak - #24
Total sales - 4,649 units

References

2009 singles
Kotoko (singer) songs
Song recordings produced by I've Sound
Songs with lyrics by Kotoko (musician)
2009 songs